Imbaimadai is a community in the Cuyuni-Mazaruni Region of Guyana.

Imbaimadai is a mining community adjoining Amerindian lands. Imbaimadai is known for its gold, diamond and other precious mineral deposits. As of 2016, only 13 mines remained of which seven were operational. The miners wanted to open up new mines, however indigenous lands complicated the situation.

Imbaimadai is also known for its natural environment, mountains that are part of the Pakaraima range, its waterfalls and its forests.

References

Populated places in Cuyuni-Mazaruni